Belknap is a village in Johnson County, Illinois, United States. The population was 104 at the 2010 census.

History

Belknap was established 1873 as a stop along what would become the Big Four Railroad. It was likely named for William Worth Belknap, who served as U.S. Secretary of War during this period. A post office was established that same year, and the village incorporated in 1880.

Geography
Belknap is located in southern Johnson County at  (37.323620, -88.940579). The village is situated in the Cache River basin northeast of Karnak and southwest of Vienna. The Heron Pond – Little Black Slough Nature Preserve lies to the north of Belknap, and the  Tunnel Hill State Trail passes through the village.

Demographics

As of the census of 2000, there were 133 people, 51 households, and 32 families residing in the village. The racial makeup of the village was 87.22% White, 0.75% African American, 1.50% from other races, and 10.53% from two or more races. Hispanic or Latino of any race were 1.50% of the population.

There were 51 households, out of which 41.2% had children under the age of 18 living with them, 58.8% were married couples living together, 5.9% had a female householder with no husband present, and 35.3% were non-families. 35.3% of all households were made up of individuals, and 15.7% had someone living alone who was 65 years of age or older. The average household size was 2.61 and the average family size was 3.45.

In the village, the population was spread out, with 29.3% under the age of 18, 7.5% from 18 to 24, 32.3% from 25 to 44, 17.3% from 45 to 64, and 13.5% who were 65 years of age or older. The median age was 32 years. For every 100 females, there were 68.4 males. For every 100 females age 18 and over, there were 84.3 males.

The median income for a household in the village was $25,625, and the median income for a family was $31,250. Males had a median income of $28,750 versus $12,250 for females. The per capita income for the village was $13,319. There were 6.1% of families and 13.2% of the population living below the poverty line, including 12.1% of under eighteens and 18.2% of those over 64.

References

External links

Villages in Johnson County, Illinois
Villages in Illinois